Aldo Starker Leopold (October 22, 1913 – August 23, 1983) was an American author, forester, zoologist and conservationist.  He also served as professor at the University of California, Berkeley for thirty years.  Throughout his life, Leopold was active in numerous wildlife and conservation groups throughout the United States.

Family and education
Born in Burlington, Iowa, in 1913, A. Starker Leopold was the oldest son of noted conservationist Aldo Leopold and Estella Bergere Leopold.  His siblings—Luna, Carl, Estella, and Nina—all made contributions to the conservation movement.  As a result of his father's employment by the United States Forest Service, Starker Leopold spent some of his youth in New Mexico; when his father began teaching at the University of Wisconsin, the family moved to Madison.

He received his B.S. from the University of Wisconsin in 1936, and then studied at the Yale Forestry School before transferring to the University of California, Berkeley, where he received his Ph.D. in Zoology in 1944.  In 1938 he married Elizabeth Weiskotten; the couple had two children.

Career at Berkeley
After working in Mexico for the Conservation Section of the Pan-American Union, Leopold returned to Berkeley in 1946 as Assistant Professor of Zoology and Conservation in the Museum of Vertebrate Zoology. He became professor in 1957. For three years (from 1960–1963) he was Assistant to the Berkeley Chancellor. In early 1967, he changed his affiliation to the School of Forestry and Conservation, where he was professor of Zoology and Forestry until his retirement as Professor Emeritus in 1978. He also served as Director of the Sagehen Creek Field Station from 1965 to 1978.

Conservation and authorship
In 1962, A. Starker Leopold was appointed as chairman to the Special Advisory Board on Wildlife Management by Secretary of the Interior Stewart Udall.  Leopold retained this association until his death twenty years later.  The Advisory Board was responsible for writing what is known as the Leopold Report, a series of recommendations regarding wildlife and ecosystem management in the country's national parks.  The Report is recognized as a seminal work for the conservation movement.

Leopold was also an active member of numerous conservation committees and organizations, including The Nature Conservancy, Sierra Club, Wilderness Society (of which his father was a founding member), and the National Wildlife Federation.

In addition to the more than 100 scientific papers he authored, Leopold wrote six books during his life.  He was elected to the National Academy of Sciences in 1970.

Books

Wildlife in Alaska (with F. F. Darling) (1953)
Wildlife of Mexico: The Game Birds and Mammals (1959)
The Desert (1961; Revised 1962; Series: LIFE Nature Library)
The California Quail (1977)
North American Game Birds and Mammals (1982) (with R. Guttierez and M. Bronson)
Wild California: Vanishing Lands, Vanishing Wildlife, (posthumous, with Elizabeth Leopold), photographs by Tupper Ansel Blake. University of California Press/The Nature Conservancy, 1985

References

External links
A. Starker Leopold at the Online Archive of California
National Academy of Sciences Biographical Memoir

1913 births
1983 deaths
American conservationists
American ecologists
American people of German descent
20th-century American zoologists
People from Burlington, Iowa
University of California, Berkeley alumni
University of California, Berkeley faculty
University of Wisconsin–Madison alumni
Members of the United States National Academy of Sciences
Yale School of Forestry & Environmental Studies alumni
Activists from California
Scientists from Iowa
Scientists from California
Activists from Iowa